Appalachian Center at Hickory (formerly Hickory Metro Higher Education Center) is a distance-education center operated by Appalachian State University. It is part of the Appalachian State University Greater Hickory Partnership, which also includes centers in Morganton, NC and Lenoir, NC.

The Hickory Metro Higher Education Center was a collaborative partnership of colleges and universities in western North Carolina. the organization's mission was to support and enhance the educational attainment and economic development of the region by offering a broad range of programming in targeted areas of study for students of all ages through off-campus programs in Hickory, NC.

HMHEC was established in 2003 as a partnership between Appalachian State University, Catawba Valley Community College, and Lenoir-Rhyne College in collaboration with the City of Hickory and Catawba County. Since its establishment, additional colleges and universities in western North Carolina joined the partnership: UNC-Chapel Hill; UNC Charlotte; Western Carolina University; Northwest AHEC; and Winston-Salem State University. In 2009, HMHEC was disbanded and the site was purchased by Appalachian State for a distance education center.

External links
 Appalachian Center at Hickory website
 Official HMHEC Website

Hickory, North Carolina
Educational organizations based in the United States
Education in Catawba County, North Carolina